HyImpulse  is a German private space launch enterprise headquartered in Neuenstadt am Kocher and developing a small launch vehicle designed around hybrid-propellant rockets.
The company is a DLR spinoff founded in 2018 out of the chemical propulsion center of the German space agency's Lampoldshausen facility.
HyImpulse is bankrolled by Rudolf Schwarz, chairman of German technology company IABG.

The company is developing a three-stage hybrid rocket designed to transport to LEO satellites of up to 500 kg named SL1.

The hybrid rocket engine uses a paraffin-based fuel and liquid oxygen.

See also 

 Isar Aerospace
 Rocket Factory Augsburg
 PLD Space

References

External links 
 Official Website

Aerospace companies of Germany
Space launch vehicles of Germany
Private spaceflight companies
Commercial spaceflight
Commercial launch service providers
German companies established in 2018